Allentown is an unincorporated community and census-designated place in Santa Rosa County, Florida, United States. Its population was 894 as of the 2010 census.

State Road 87 (SR 87), SR 89, and County Road 182 (CR 182) pass through the community. The intersection of CR 182 and SR 89 is typically referred by locals as "downtown Allentown" or simply "the caution light."

Central School and the local volunteer fire department are located in Allentown.  There are two small churches within the community. Navy T-6 Training planes are frequently heard overhead due to the close proximity of NAS Whiting Field to the east.

Geography

Demographics

References

Unincorporated communities in Santa Rosa County, Florida
Unincorporated communities in Florida
Census-designated places in Santa Rosa County, Florida
Census-designated places in Florida